Teen Spirit is a deodorant, originally sold by Mennen, then Colgate-Palmolive (after Colgate-Palmolive acquired Mennen in 1992).

Teen Spirit was first released by Mennen early in 1991, and with heavy advertising campaigns, it had soon "established a market niche" with teen girls. Sales were boosted by the grunge band Nirvana's "Smells Like Teen Spirit", which Kurt Cobain unwittingly named after the deodorant.

When Mennen was acquired by Colgate-Palmolive in 1992, the Teen Spirit brand was said to be the most popular product of its kind in the US, and was the favorite of nearly 1/4 of all teenage girls. Because of its immense popularity, Colgate-Palmolive planned to begin a new hair care line with the Teen Spirit name. The new hair care products were released in August and sold well, as expected. 
The Teen Spirit name began to lose its share of the market, just as the song with the same name started to drop off the charts. Before long, the company was forced to drop the hair care line, but kept the deodorants. Today, all that is left of the Teen Spirit franchise is "Teen-Spirit Stick." Teen Spirit Stick is now only offered in two fragrances, Pink Crush and Sweet Strawberry. It is available in either the 1.4 or 2.3 ounce (40 or 69 gram) sizes.

Scents
Pink Crush
Sweet Strawberry 
 Discontinued scents:
 Berry Blossom
 Pop Star 
 Baby Powder Soft 
 Romantic Rose
 California Breeze
 Ocean Surf 
 Caribbean Cool 
Orchard Blossom
Cool Coconut

References

External links
Colgate-Palmolive Homepage
Teen Spirit Home Page
Smells like Teen Spirit Commercial from 1992

Colgate-Palmolive brands
Products introduced in 1991